Cristo Rei (Portuguese, 'Christ the King') may refer to:

Cristo Rei Administrative Post, Dili municipality, East Timor
Cristo Rei Beach
Cristo Rei of Dili, a statue 
Cristo Rei, Lubango, a statue in Angola
Cristo Rei, Madeira, a statue in Caniço, Madeira
Christ the King (Almada), a statue facing Lisbon, in Portugal

See also

Cristo Rey (disambiguation), the Spanish equivalent
Christ the King (disambiguation)